The Johnsontown Tobacco Barn No. 2 is a historic tobacco barn in Charles County, Maryland, near La Plata.  The barn was built c. 1820, and provides evidence of early use of fire in the tobacco curing process.  The framing of the barn is hand-hewn timbers secured by wooden pegs, with pit-sawn secondary framing members.  The exterior is sheathed in vertical board siding, although there is evidence that it was originally sheathed in horizontal siding.

The barn was listed on the National Register of Historic Places in 2011.

References

External links
, including undated photo, at Maryland Historical Trust

Buildings and structures in Charles County, Maryland
Barns on the National Register of Historic Places in Maryland
Tobacco buildings in the United States
Buildings and structures completed in 1820
Barns in Maryland
National Register of Historic Places in Charles County, Maryland
Tobacco barns